Nareit is a Washington, D.C.-based association representing a large and diverse industry that includes equity real estate investment trusts (REITs), mortgage REITs (mREITs), REITs traded on major stock exchanges, public non-listed REITs, and private REITs. Nareit is the voice for REITs and publicly traded real estate with an interest in U.S. real estate and capital markets. Nareit is also an informational resource for policymakers in countries around the world that have introduced or are considering introducing REITs. It is recognized as the leading public resource on the REIT industry, and it provides performance data on REITs dating back to 1972.

Nareit’s mission is to actively advocate for REIT-based real estate investment with policymakers and the global investment community. Nareit’s members are REITs and other businesses throughout the world that own, operate, and finance income-producing real estate, as well as those firms and individuals who advise, study, and service those businesses.[5] It is run by an independent executive board[6] led by President and CEO Steven A. Wechsler.[7]

History
On September 14, 1960, President Dwight D. Eisenhower signed legislation to create a new approach to real estate investment for income. The following day on Sept. 15, 1960, The National Association of Real Estate was incorporated. This association eventually evolved into the entity known today as Nareit. It has partnered with several other entities in its investor outreach endeavors, most notably the FTSE Group and the European Public Real Estate Association. Through their combined efforts they have established the FTSE EPRA / Nareit Global Real Estate Index Series.

Publications
Nareit produces a variety of publications targeted to members, investors, industry professionals, and policy makers. Nareit’s website, reit.com, remains the association’s primary communications tool to all of its audiences. REIT: Real Estate Investment Today magazine is Nareit’s bi-monthly magazine focused on the REIT approach to real estate investment. In addition, Nareit publishes a daily executive news summary (Real Estate Investment SmartBrief), several member newsletters, a weekly REIT Report podcast, and multiple educational materials. The Nareit organization compiles a group of indexes that are composed exclusively of publicly traded REITs. Among those topline indexes are:

The FTSE Nareit All REITs Index - An index composed of all publicly traded REITS in relative marketing weightings. The index is available via real-time updates and is rebalanced on a monthly basis. This is done for new and merged REITS along with the issuance of equity by existing REITs.
FTSE Nareit Equity REIT Index - While it contains the same data as the Nareit Index, this index excludes mortgage REITs to reflect a pure equity real estate benchmark.
FTSE Nareit Mortgage REIT Index - An index of all publicly traded mortgage REITS.

Activities

Nareit hosts a variety of industry events each year to help educate, inform, and distribute information to members, investors, and industry professionals. REITWorld: Nareit's Annual Convention for All Things REIT is one of the leading REIT industry events of the year. The annual REITWeek: Nareit’s investor Forum is an investor forum that brings a large concentration of REIT  management teams and investors in a  single location, providing a yearly hub where people are able to network and gain informed developments within the industry.

Awards
Each year Nareit recognizes the achievements and contributions of its members and noted industry professionals. Among those awards are the Industry Leadership Award, Industry Achievement Award, Leader in the Light Awards, Small Investor Empowerment Award and Investor Care Awards.

External links
Official website
NAREIT letter to U.S. Commodity Futures Trading Commission

References

Real estate-related professional associations
Organizations based in Washington, D.C.
Real estate investment trusts